Thomas William Selleck (born January 29, 1945) is an American actor. His breakout role was playing private investigator Thomas Magnum in the television series Magnum, P.I. (1980–1988), for which he received five Emmy Award nominations for Outstanding Lead Actor in a Drama Series, winning in 1985. Since 2010, Selleck has co-starred as New York City Police Commissioner Frank Reagan in the series Blue Bloods. Beginning in 2005, he has portrayed troubled small-town police chief Jesse Stone in nine television films based on the Robert B. Parker novels.

In films, Selleck has played bachelor architect Peter Mitchell in Three Men and a Baby (1987) and its sequel Three Men and a Little Lady (1990). He has also appeared in more than 50 other film and television roles since Magnum, P.I., including the films Quigley Down Under, Mr. Baseball, and Lassiter. He appeared in recurring television roles as Monica Geller's love interest Dr. Richard Burke on Friends, as Lance White, the likeable and naive partner on The Rockford Files, and as casino owner A.J. Cooper on Las Vegas. He also had a lead role in the television western film The Sacketts, based on two of Louis L'Amour's books.

Selleck is a California Army National Guard veteran, a spokesman for the National Rifle Association (NRA), an endorser in advertisements for National Review magazine, and co-founder of the Character Counts! organization.

Early life

Family
Selleck was born in Detroit, Michigan, in 1945, to housewife Martha Selleck and Robert Dean Selleck, who was an executive and real estate investor. He has an elder brother Robert (born 1944), a younger sister Martha (born 1954), and a younger brother Daniel (born 1956).

His father was of primarily British ancestry but had distant Serbian ancestry as well, while his mother was of British descent...on her paternal side they were miners from Worsborough, Barnsley, Yorkshire and Martha Jagger's grandfather Thomas Jagger emigrated to Pennsylvania in 1881. Thomas Jagger's grandfather, also named Thomas, was killed in Worsborough mine in 1844 aged 36 and the Jagger family can be traced back at least another three generations in that area. It is estimated that near 30 men of the Jagger family were killed in mines in that era.
Through an entirely paternal line, Selleck is a direct descendant of British colonist David Selleck who moved to Massachusetts from Somerset, England, in 1633. Through this line, Selleck is of the 11th generation of his family born in North America.

Selleck's family moved to Sherman Oaks, California, in 1948.

Education
Selleck graduated from Grant High School in 1962 and enrolled at Los Angeles Valley College, living at home and saving money. He also was a pitcher for the USC baseball team. He is a member of Sigma Chi fraternity and a member of the Trojan Knights. While Selleck was majoring in Business Administration, a drama coach suggested he try acting and, in his senior year, he dropped out of the university. Selleck then studied acting at the Beverly Hills Playhouse, under Milton Katselas.

California National Guard
Upon receiving a draft notice during the Vietnam War, Selleck joined the California National Guard. He served in the 160th Infantry Regiment of the California Army National Guard from 1967 to 1973.

Career

Early work

Selleck's first television appearance was as a college senior on The Dating Game in 1965 and again in 1967. Soon after, he appeared in commercials for products such as Pepsi-Cola.

He began his career with bit parts in smaller movies, including Myra Breckinridge (invited on the set by Mae West), Coma, and The Seven Minutes. He appeared in a number of TV series, mini-series and TV movies. He was also the face of Salem cigarettes and Revlon's Chaz cologne. Selleck appeared in the commercial for Right Guard deodorant in 1971, with Farrah Fawcett in 1972 for the aperitif Dubonnet, and another in 1977 for the toothpaste Close-Up. He was also in a Safeguard deodorant soap commercial (1972). In 1972, he starred in the B-movie Daughters of Satan. He had a recurring role in the 1970s as private investigator Lance White in The Rockford Files.

Selleck is an avid outdoorsman, marksman and firearms collector. These interests led him to leading-man cowboy roles in Western films, starting with his role as cowboy and frontier marshal Orrin Sackett in the 1979 film The Sacketts, opposite Sam Elliott, Jeff Osterhage, and Western legends Glenn Ford and Ben Johnson, and that same year, Concrete Cowboys with Jerry Reed. The Shadow Riders followed in 1982. Then Selleck shifted gears, portraying a cat burglar in 1930s London in Lassiter in 1984. Quigley Down Under is one of his best-known Western films, but it was for his 1997 role in Last Stand at Saber River that he won a "Western Heritage Award".

Magnum stardom
Selleck's big break came when he was cast in the lead role as Thomas Magnum in Magnum, P.I. The producers would not release the actor for other projects, so Selleck had to pass on the role of Indiana Jones in Raiders of the Lost Ark, which meant that the role went to actor Harrison Ford instead. It turned out that the shooting of the pilot for Magnum was delayed for over six months by a writers' strike, which would have enabled him to complete Raiders.

Selleck played the role of Thomas Magnum in 1980 after filming six other TV pilots that were never sold. Magnum was a former U.S. Navy Officer, a veteran of a Special Operations unit, "SEAL" in the Vietnam War, and later a member of the "Naval Intelligence Agency" (a fictional version of the Office of Naval Intelligence), who had resigned his commission with the Navy to become a private investigator living in Hawaii. The show continued until 1988, lasting eight seasons and 163 episodes, winning him an Emmy Award for Outstanding Lead Actor in a Drama Series in 1984.

Selleck was famous for his mustache, a Hawaiian-style aloha shirt, a Detroit Tigers baseball cap, and a Colt MKIV/Series 70 Government Model handgun (a commercial version of the U.S. Military M1911A1) which his character regularly carried. The actual prop from the show was a 9×19mm Parabellum, serial number 70L33101, used for its reliable functioning with readily available blanks, although the original gun was a traditional .45 ACP 1911. Magnum also used a Star Model B, another 9mm similar to the M1911A1, and a Detonics Pocket 9 during the series.

Magnum drove a Ferrari 308 GTS in the series. The model became so identified with the role that Ferrari fans now refer to the red-painted model as a "Magnum" Ferrari.

After the end of the show in 1988, it established itself as the top-rated one-hour show in the history of syndicated reruns (at least until 1998). Selleck confirmed that he was the most popular choice by fans to play the role of Magnum in the once-rumored Magnum, P.I. movie.

In 1984, he introduced Nancy Reagan at the 1984 Republican National Convention.

Selleck was offered the lead role of Mitch Buchannon in Baywatch, but he turned down the role because he did not want to be seen as a sex symbol. The role eventually went to David Hasselhoff.

During the Magnum years, he also starred as an acrophobic police detective in Runaway and a stand-in father in Three Men and a Baby, which was the biggest hit at the American box office in 1987. In 1989, he ended the decade by starring in the romantic comedy, Her Alibi and crime drama An Innocent Man.

TV and advertising

In 1990, he starred as an American 19th-century sharpshooter in the Australian Western Quigley Down Under, a role and film that he considers one of his best. During the 1990s, he also starred in Three Men and a Little Lady, Folks!, Christopher Columbus: The Discovery, Mr. Baseball, In & Out and The Love Letter. Selleck's role in In & Out is his first as a gay character (Peter Malloy).

In the mid-1990s Selleck played the role of Richard Burke, Monica's older boyfriend, beginning at the end of the second season of the TV series Friends. Richard was a divorced ophthalmologist who was a friend of Monica's parents, and at first the relationship was hidden from her parents. The relationship eventually ended over Richard's reluctance to commit to having children, though Selleck did make a few more appearances in later episodes. His decision to star in a six-episode plot of Friends was seen as a digression from the movies back to TV shows and a mistake by his career advisers. Selleck recruited a new agent and accepted the part. This role earned him an Emmy Award nomination in 2000 for Outstanding Guest Actor in a Comedy Series.

He did the voice-over for the 1993 AT&T advertising campaigns titled "You Will." These advertisements had a futuristic feel, and posed the question of, "What if you had the technology to _? Well, you will ... and the company that will bring it to you? AT&T."

In the mid-1990s Selleck hosted a special series on TLC called The Practical Guide to the Universe, in which he talked about the stars, planets, galaxies, etc.

In February 1998, he accepted the lead role in a sitcom for CBS called The Closer. This role was his big comeback on prime-time TV. In it he played Jack McLaren, a legendary publicist heading up a brand new marketing firm. His costars included Ed Asner, David Krumholtz, and Penelope Ann Miller. Despite the high pedigree, and the expectations for Selleck's first series since Magnum, P.I., low ratings caused the show to be canceled after ten episodes.

His last two cowboy roles to date were in the 2001 TNT movie Crossfire Trail (based on a Louis L'Amour novel of the same name), and the 2003 motion picture Monte Walsh. In 2001, Selleck played the lead role of Murray in a Broadway revival of Herb Gardner's comedic play A Thousand Clowns. The production toured for four months, playing in North Carolina, Chicago and Boston before opening on Broadway at the Longacre Theatre. Critics, though far from uniformly negative about Selleck's performance, generally compared it unfavorably to that of Jason Robards, who won awards in the 1960s for playing the character on the stage and in a movie version. The production closed as a result of the attacks on 9/11.

Selleck played the role of General Dwight D. Eisenhower in A&E's 2004 made-for-TV movie Ike: Countdown to D-Day. The movie showed the planning, politics, and preparation for the 1944 Invasion of Normandy, and Selleck was critically lauded for playing a cool, calm Eisenhower.

Since 2005, Selleck has starred in the role of transplanted lawman Jesse Stone in a series of made-for-TV movies based on Robert B. Parker's novels. To date, the series comprises nine films, with the most recent released in October 2015. In addition to his portrayal of the films' protagonist, Selleck now acts as producer for the series. The fifth film, Jesse Stone: Thin Ice, was not adapted from Parker's novels, but was instead an original story by Selleck.

He joined the cast of the NBC drama Las Vegas in the season-five premiere on September 28, 2007. He played A.J. Cooper, the new owner of the Montecito Casino. He replaced James Caan, who left the cast in the same episode. This was Selleck's first regular role in a drama show since he played Thomas Magnum in Magnum, P.I. As of December 30, 2007, he began doing commercial voice-overs for Florida's Natural orange juice.

Since 2010, he has starred as Frank Reagan in the CBS American police procedural/drama series Blue Bloods, filmed on location in New York City. Frank Reagan is the Police Commissioner, and the series follows the Reagan family of police officers with the New York City Police Department. The show premiered on September 24, 2010, and is in its twelfth season as of 2021–22.

In 2012, Selleck was featured in Coldwell Banker's television ad campaign focusing on homeownership. On August 1, 2016, American Advisors Group (AAG), the leading reverse-mortgage lender, announced the premiere of its new television commercial campaign naming Selleck as the company's new national spokesperson following the death of Fred Thompson, their previous spokesperson. The commercials began running across cable and national networks including ABC, NBC and CBS.

Selleck appeared in a recurring role on the acclaimed ABC drama Boston Legal as Ivan Tiggs, the troubled ex-husband of Shirley Schmidt (Candice Bergen).

In 2021, Selleck made his album debut singing “Yessir, That’s My Baby” with Nicolas King (recorded live in 2001 during their run of “A Thousand Clowns”) on King's album “Act One” released by Club44 Records.

Personal life

From 1971 to 1982, Selleck was married to model Jacqueline Ray. During that time, he adopted her son, Kevin Shepard (born 1966), former drummer for the American rock band Tonic. On August 7, 1987, Selleck married Jillie Joan Mack (born 1957). They have one daughter, Hannah (born December 16, 1988).

Selleck and his family live near Thousand Oaks-Westlake Village, California, on a  avocado ranch in Hidden Valley formerly owned by Dean Martin. In a 2012 interview with People, Selleck talked about living and working on his ranch: "So I like to get outside and work on the ranch, from fixing roads to clearing brush. I hate going to the gym, so sweating outdoors sure beats sitting on a stationary bike staring at my navel. And I work cheaper than anyone I could hire to do it."

Selleck is an accomplished indoor and beach volleyball player, playing the outside hitter position for the Outrigger Canoe Club, Honolulu. (Son Kevin attended Selleck's alma mater, USC, and became a volleyball team All-American in 1990.) Outrigger Canoe Club teammate Dennis Berg, in the summer 2011 issue of Volleyball USA magazine, said of Selleck, "Tom was a great teammate, appreciative of being included with such a talented and experienced group, practicing and playing hard when his Magnum schedule permitted.... He was very patient with all of us, and we relished the big crowds that replaced the usual sparse number of players' friends and spouses at the national tourney matches."

Selleck is an avid ice hockey fan and has been seen attending Los Angeles Kings games at Staples Center. He lists Anže Kopitar and Alexander Frolov as two of his favorite players. He was once a minority owner of the Detroit Tigers, his favorite baseball team since childhood. In preparation for his role in the film Mr. Baseball, Selleck reached out to the Tigers to practice with them during the spring of 1991. He took batting practice for three weeks, even making an appearance in an exhibition game against Cincinnati, where Tiger manager Sparky Anderson had him play in the pinch hitter role. Selleck believes his training helped him considerably in his film role, having gained valuable experience from attending team meetings and developing an understanding of how competitive players function together.

One of Selleck's Magnum co-stars, Larry Manetti, in his 1996 memoir Aloha Magnum, was lavish in his praise of Selleck. Manetti lauded Selleck for his extraordinary work ethic on a grueling show (shooting for hours in the midday Hawaiian sun), Selleck's work with Hawaiian charities, and his willingness to support the program's cast and crew members.

In February 2009, Selleck joined the Vietnam Veterans Memorial Fund as national spokesman for the new Education Center being built on the National Mall.

Upon James Garner's death in 2014, he said, "Jim was a mentor to me and a friend, and I will miss him." Two years after Garner's death, Selleck said, prior to filming his then 6th season of Blue Bloods: "It's kind of like my mentor, who never wanted to hear he was my mentor (James Garner), I don't accept the mentor role. That they feel that way is, I think flattering although it adds a certain amount of pressure."

2015 water lawsuit
Selleck was sued by the Calleguas Municipal Water District for allegedly improperly transferring approximately 1.4 million gallons of water from the Calleguas Municipal Water District to the Hidden Valley Municipal Water District during the driest California drought since record-keeping began, which he used to water his avocado farm. He settled the suit by paying $21,685.55 to the Calleguas Municipal Water District, an amount which represented the district's private investigator fees in connection with the case. By settling, Selleck avoided a trial while simultaneously not admitting to any fault or wrongdoing.

Political views

Selleck has been a member of the board of directors of the National Rifle Association and served as a spokesman for the organization. He resigned from the board on September 18, 2018, though he remained a member of the organization. After his close friend Charlton Heston stepped down from his role as an NRA spokesman in 2003, Selleck succeeded him. In 2002, Selleck donated the rifle he used in Quigley Down Under (a custom 13-pound [6 kg], single-shot, 1874 Sharps Rifle, with a 34-inch [86-cm] barrel), along with six other firearms from his other films, to the NRA. The firearms are part of the NRA's exhibit "Real Guns of Reel Heroes" at the National Firearms Museum in Fairfax, Virginia.

To promote his film The Love Letter, Selleck was invited to be on The Rosie O'Donnell Show on May 19, 1999. During the appearance, O'Donnell questioned Selleck about his support of gun ownership and an ad in which he appeared supporting the NRA. At the end of the interview, Selleck stated, "It's your show, and you can talk about it after I leave."  Selleck later confided to Shaun Robinson that he forgives O'Donnell, stating "I still like Rosie. I think she needs to take a deep breath and stop thinking everybody who disagrees with her is evil."

For a number of years, Selleck appeared in television advertising for National Review. He also subscribes to The New Republic.  Selleck describes himself as "a registered independent with a lot of libertarian leanings."

In the 2016 presidential election, Selleck did not support either Hillary Clinton or Donald Trump, instead writing in former Dallas Police Department Chief David Brown, saying that he was deeply touched by the grace and leadership Brown showed through the 2016 Dallas police shooting.

Filmography

Awards and honors

On April 28, 2000, Selleck received an honorary doctorate degree from Pepperdine University. He was chosen because of his outstanding character and ethic. He is a board member of the non-profit Joseph and Edna Josephson Institute of Ethics and co-founder of the Character Counts Coalition. He received a Star on the Hollywood Walk of Fame in 1986. The star is situated at 6925 Hollywood Blvd. In 1989, he received the Golden Plate Award of the American Academy of Achievement.

References

External links

 
 
 
 
 

20th-century American male actors
21st-century American male actors
1945 births
Activists from California
American gun rights activists
American libertarians
American male film actors
American male television actors
American men's basketball players
American people of English descent
American people of Serbian descent
Basketball players from California
Basketball players from Michigan
Best Drama Actor Golden Globe (television) winners
California National Guard personnel
California Independents
Christians from California
Junior college men's basketball players in the United States
Living people
Los Angeles Valley College people
Male actors from Detroit
Male actors from Los Angeles
Military personnel from California
Military personnel from Detroit
Outstanding Performance by a Lead Actor in a Drama Series Primetime Emmy Award winners
People from Fallbrook, California
People from Thousand Oaks, California
United States Army soldiers
USC Trojans men's basketball players
Winthrop family
Grant High School (Los Angeles) alumni